Meshack Franklin (1772 – December 18, 1839) was a Congressional Representative from North Carolina; born in Surry County, North Carolina, in 1772; Brother of Jesse Franklin. member of the State house of commons in 1800 and 1801; served in the State senate in 1828, 1829, and 1838; elected as a Democratic-Republican to the Tenth and to the three succeeding Congresses (March 4, 1807 – March 3, 1815); died in Surry County, N.C., December 18, 1839.  Franklin's house, built by his father-in-law Gideon Edwards in 1799, is currently owned and maintained by the Surry County Historical Society as the Edwards-Franklin House.

See also 
 Tenth United States Congress
 Eleventh United States Congress
 Twelfth United States Congress
 Thirteenth United States Congress

External links

1772 births
1839 deaths
People from Surry County, North Carolina
Members of the North Carolina House of Representatives
North Carolina state senators
Democratic-Republican Party members of the United States House of Representatives from North Carolina